Edesville is an unincorporated community and census-designated place in Kent County, Maryland, United States. Its population was 169 as of the 2010 census.

Demographics

References

Census-designated places in Kent County, Maryland
Census-designated places in Maryland